Serous demilunes, also known as Crescents of Giannuzzi or Demilunes of Heidenhain, are cellular formations in the shape of a half-moon (hence the name "demilune") on some salivary glands.

Serous demilunes are the serous cells at the distal end of mucous tubuloalveolar secretory unit of certain salivary glands. These demilune cells secrete the proteins that contain the enzyme lysozyme, which degrades the cell walls of bacteria. In this way, lysozyme confers antimicrobial activity to mucus.

The serous demilune is an artifact from traditional methods of preparing samples. Samples are traditionally preserved and fixed in formaldehyde. When samples were preserved by quick-freezing in liquid nitrogen and then fixed with osmium tetraoxide in acetone, no demilunes were found. Examination showed that the serous cells and mucosal cells were aligned in the acinus. The traditional preparation caused mucous cells to swell during fixation which results in the serous cells being popped out of their alignment. After sectioning the serous cells resembled the common demilune shape, and were so named.

When the gland has this demilunar structure, it produces both serous and mucous secretions, and is thus classified as "mixed".

See also
Giuseppe Oronzo Giannuzzi
Rudolf Heidenhain

External links
  - "Trachea"
 
 Slide at cytochemistry.net

Notes

Glands